Motty (11 July – 21 July 1978) was the only proven hybrid between an Asian and an African elephant. The male calf was born in Chester Zoo, to Asian mother Sheba and African father Jumbolino. He was named after George Mottershead, who founded the Chester Zoo in 1931.

Appearance
Motty's head and ears were morphologically like Loxodonta (African), while the toenail numbers, with 5 on the front feet and 4 on the hind were that of Elephas (Asian). The trunk had a single trunk finger as seen in Elephas but the trunk length was more similar to Loxodonta. His vertebral column showed an Loxodonta profile above the shoulders transitioning to the convex hump profile of Elephas below the shoulders.

Cause of death
Despite intensive human care, Motty died of an umbilical infection 10 days after his birth on 21 July. The necropsy revealed death to be due to necrotizing enterocolitis and E. coli septicaemia present in both his colon and the umbilical cord.

Preservation
His body was preserved by a private company, and is a mounted specimen at the Natural History Museum in London.

Other hybrids
The straight-tusked elephant, an extinct elephant whose closest extant relative is the African forest elephant, interbred with the Asian elephant, as recovered DNA has shown.

Although the Asian elephant Elephas maximus and the African elephant Loxodonta africana belong to different genera, they share the same number of chromosomes, thus making hybridisation possible.

See also
 List of individual elephants

References

External links
Koehl D, Elephant Encyclopedia: Motty, the Hybrid Elephant

1978 animal births
1978 animal deaths
Individual elephants
Mammal hybrids
Intergeneric hybrids